The Santos-Dumont Merit Medal is a Brazilian decoration created to honor civilians and military, Brazilian or foreign, for outstanding services rendered to the Brazilian Air Force or in recognition of its qualities and value in relation to aeronautics.

History
It was created by Decree No. 39,905, of September 5, 1956, on the occasion of the 50th anniversary of the first flight of the Santos-Dumont 14-bis plane.

The medal is granted by act of the Commander of the Air Force. The merit of the candidates eligible to be awarded the medal is examined by the Santos-Dumont Merit Council. The council consists of the Commander of the Aeronautics, acting
as its President; the Chief of the Aeronautics Staff; the General Staff Commander; and, as secretary, the Chief of Staff of the Commander of the Air Force.

External links
 Santos-Dumont Merit Medal - Almanac of Awardees - Recipients of the medal, as of july 2022.

References

Santos-Dumont Merit Medal
Awards established in 1956
1956 establishments in Brazil
Alberto Santos-Dumont